Aaj Ki Duniya is a 1940 Bollywood film directed by G.P. Pawar. Starring Asha Lata, Trilok Kapoor, Jeevan, S. Nazir, and Vatsala Kumtekar, the film premiered in Bombay on 1 January 1940.

Cast
Nazir
Asha Lata
Trilok Kapoor
Vatsala Kumtekar
Gulab
Jeevan

References

External links
 

1940 films
1940s Hindi-language films
Indian black-and-white films
Indian drama films
1940 drama films
Hindi-language drama films